Helsinki Napoli All Night Long (also released as Helsinki – Napoli) is a gangster-comedy film written, directed and produced by Mika Kaurismäki. The film was released in Italy as Napoli–Berlino – Un taxi nella notte, with Berlin replacing Helsinki in the title.

Cast 
 Kari Väänänen: Alex
 Roberta Manfredi: Stella
 Jean-Pierre Castaldi: Igor
 Margi Clarke: Mara
 Nino Manfredi: Grandpa
 Eddie Constantine: Old Gangster
 Ugo Fangareggi: Neapolitan
 Samuel Fuller: Boss
 Melanie Robeson: Lilli
 Jim Jarmusch: Barkeeper
 Sakari Kuosmanen: Young Gangster
 Remo Remotti: Neapolitan
 Wim Wenders: Gas Station Attendant
 Harry Baer: Man

References

External links

1987 films
1980s comedy thriller films
1980s crime comedy films
Films directed by Mika Kaurismäki
Finnish crime comedy films
Films set in Berlin
Films set in West Germany
Films about taxis
1987 comedy films